Charles Leo Goodrum  (January 11, 1950-July 6, 2013) was a guard and offensive tackle in the National Football League for the Minnesota Vikings. Goodrum attended Florida A&M University.

In 2009, Charles Goodrum was living in East Palatka, Florida.
He's married and has two sons, one daughter and four grandchildren.

1950 births
2013 deaths
Players of American football from Miami
American football offensive guards
American football offensive tackles
Florida A&M Rattlers football players
Minnesota Vikings players